The Combined Scottish Universities was a three-member university constituency of the House of Commons of the Parliament of the United Kingdom from 1918 until 1950. It was created by merging the single-member constituencies of Glasgow and Aberdeen Universities and Edinburgh and St Andrews Universities.

Boundaries

The constituency was not a physical area but was rather elected by the graduates of the Scottish Universities of St Andrews, Edinburgh, Glasgow and Aberdeen.

The constituency returned three Members of Parliament to Westminster, elected by Single Transferable Vote.  The by-elections used the first past the post voting system.

This University constituency was created by the Representation of the People Act 1918 and abolished in 1950 by the Representation of the People Act 1948.

Members of Parliament

Election results

Elections in the 1910s

Elections in the 1920s

Elections in the 1930s

Elections in the 1940s

References

Historic parliamentary constituencies in Scotland (Westminster)
University constituencies of the Parliament of the United Kingdom
Constituencies
Constituencies of the Parliament of the United Kingdom established in 1918
Constituencies of the Parliament of the United Kingdom disestablished in 1950
Higher education in Scotland
1918 establishments in Scotland